Angela Jackson is an American poet, playwright, and novelist.

Angela Jackson may also refer to:
 Angela Jackson (writer), British historian and writer
 Angela Jackson (basketball), women's basketball coach